Ratkovo is a village located in the Odžaci municipality, West Bačka District, Vojvodina, Serbia. As of 2011, the population of the village is 3,411 inhabitants.

Name
The former name of the town was Parabuć. In German, it was known as Parabutsch, and in Hungarian as Paripás or Parabuty.

History
The village was first mentioned in 1543. During the Ottoman rule (16th-17th century), Parabuć was populated by Serbs. Since the end of the 17th century, the village belonged to the Habsburg monarchy, and since 1781 many Germans settled here besides Serbs. Between 1918 and 1991, it was part of Yugoslavia.

Demographics

According to the last official census done in 2011, the village of Ratkovo has 3,411 inhabitants.

Gallery

Notable people
 Jovica Stanišić (b. 1950), intelligence officer, former Head of the State Security Service
 Kaća Čelan (b. 1956), writer, director and actress
 Boško Perošević (1956–2000), politician, former Chairmen of the Executive Council of Vojvodina

See also
 List of places in Serbia
 List of cities, towns and villages in Vojvodina

References

External links

 Ratkovo

Places in Bačka
Populated places in Vojvodina
Odžaci